Clifford George Hildreth (December 8, 1917 – August 15, 1995) was an American econometrician. He was a head of the Department of Economics at Michigan State University.

A native of McPherson, Kansas, Hildreth earned his bachelor's from the University of Kansas before entering Iowa State University for graduate studies. After years at University of Chicago and North Carolina State University, he joined the faculty at Michigan State, before going to the University of Minnesota in 1964 where he held joint appointments in the Department of Economics, the School of Statistics and the Department of Agricultural and Applied Economics. He retired in 1988. His most notable contribution was a procedure for estimating a linear model in the presence of autocorrelated error terms, known as Hildreth–Lu estimation.

In 1960 he was elected as a Fellow of the American Statistical Association.  He was President of the American Statistical Association in 1973, and the editor of the Journal of the American Statistical Association from 1960 to 1965.  He was also a fellow of the Econometric Society and the Institute of Mathematical Statistics.

Bibliography

References

External links 
 

1917 births
1995 deaths
Economists from Kansas
University of Kansas alumni
Iowa State University alumni
Michigan State University faculty
University of Minnesota faculty
Time series econometricians
Death in Oregon
20th-century American mathematicians
20th-century American economists
Fellows of the Econometric Society
Fellows of the American Statistical Association
People from McPherson, Kansas